The Progressive Bloc was an alliance of political forces in the Russian Empire and occupied 236 of the 442 seats in the Imperial Duma.

It was formed when the State Duma of the Russian Empire was recalled to session during World War I, the response of Nicholas II of Russia to mounting social tensions. On instigation of Pavel Milyukov the Progressist Party combined with the Kadet Party, Left Octobrists, and progressive Nationalists and individual politicians as Vasily Shulgin to form a political front in the Duma that called for a "government of confidence". According to the Bolsheviks it supported a social-chauvinist stance towards the continuation of World War I.

The program content was determined by the desire to find common ground for an agreement with the government on the basis of a minimum of liberal reforms. "The Progressive Bloc's program included demands for political and religious amnesty, the abolition of restrictions on nationalities and faiths (Poles, Jews, etc.), and the freedom of trade unions. The Bloc's main demand was the formation of a “ministry of confidence.” A meeting took place on 9 September 1915 between the Bloc's representatives and ministers, where the deputies not only demanded the fulfillment of the Bloc's program, but also the resignation of the ministers themselves. The negotiations resulted in the government advocating for the Duma's suspension, which took place on 16 September 1915." The Imperial Duma was sent into recess by the Tsar and would not gather again until February 1916.

By the beginning of 1916, Alexei Khvostov came to a compromise with the Progressive Bloc, relying on the moderate nature of its demands. The Duma gathered on 9 February after the 76-year-old Ivan Goremykin, opposed to the convening of the Duma, had been dismissed and replaced by Boris Stürmer as prime minister. However the deputies were disappointed when Stürmer held his speech. Because of the war, he said, it was not the time for constitutional reforms. For the first time in his life, the Tsar made a visit to the Taurida Palace, which made it practically impossible to hiss at the new prime minister Stürmer.

In October 1916 the opposition parties decided to attack Stürmer, his government and the "Dark forces". For the Octobrists and the Kadets, the liberals in the parliament, Grigori Rasputin, who believed in autocracy and absolute monarchy, was one of the main obstacles. On 1 November (O.S.) the government under  Boris Stürmer  was attacked by Milyukov in the Imperial Duma. The Progressist Party left the Bloc after demanding for a responsible government. Stürmer and Alexander Protopopov (his unexpected appointment was seen as a provocation designed to split the Bloc) asked in vain for the dissolution of the Duma. Alexander Guchkov reported that five members of the Progressive Bloc, including Kerensky, Aleksandr Konovalov, Nikolai Vissarionovich Nekrasov and Mikhail Tereschenko would consider a coup d'etat, but did not undertake any action. Grand Duke Nikolai refused to cooperate, saying that the army would not support a coup. The Progressive Bloc supported a resolution that the Tsar was to be replaced by his son Tsarevich Alexei. The new prime minister Alexander Trepov offered to satisfy some of the Bloc's demands.

In the lead up to the February revolution 1917, it is often argued to play a crucial role in the uprising's success through the suggestion to Tsar Nicholas II that he should establish a 'government of public confidence'. The Tsar instead made little attempt to make political reform or slip into a constitutional monarch that, potentially, could have saved the Romanov dynasty.

References

1915 establishments in the Russian Empire
Defunct political party alliances in Russia
Political parties established in 1915
Political parties in the Russian Empire
Political parties of the Russian Revolution